Zhao Kun (born 10 January 1973) is a Chinese former swimmer who competed in the 1992 Summer Olympics. She swam in the heats of the 4x100 m freestyle relay.

References

1973 births
Living people
Chinese female freestyle swimmers
Olympic swimmers of China
Swimmers at the 1992 Summer Olympics
Olympic silver medalists for China
Medalists at the 1992 Summer Olympics
Olympic silver medalists in swimming